The list of current and past Rajya Sabha members from the Madhya Pradesh State. The state elects 11 member for a term of six years and these members indirectly elected by the state legislators of Madhya Pradesh using single transferable votes. Members sit for staggered six-year terms, with one third of the members retiring every two years.

History of Rajya Sabha seats
Earlier, since 1952, there were 12 seats from Madhya Pradesh, 6 seats from Madhya Bharat, 4 seats from Vindhya Pradesh state and 1 seat from Bhopal State to Rajya Sabha. After Constitution (Seventh Amendment) Act, 1956, there were 16 seats from Madhya Pradesh. After the Madhya Pradesh Reorganisation Act, 2000, 5 seats are allocated to Chhattisgarh state from Madhya Pradesh State, reducing its seats from 16 to 11 seats, since 15 November 2000.

Current members
Keys:

List of all Rajya Sabha Members from Madhya Pradesh State 
List by Last Name

The list is Incomplete.
 Star (*) Represents current Rajya Sabha members from MP State.

References

External links
Rajya Sabha homepage hosted by the Indian government
List of Sitting Members of Rajya Sabha (Term Wise) 
MEMBERS OF RAJYA SABHA (STATE WISE RETIREMENT LIST) 

Madhya Pradesh
 
Lists of people from Madhya Pradesh